Dorem Amerike ('South America') was a Yiddish-language literary monthly magazine published in Argentina in 1926-1927. Politically, Dorem Amerike was pro-communist but without open affiliation to the Communist Party of Argentina.

References

1925 establishments in Argentina
1926 disestablishments in Argentina
Literary magazines published in Argentina
Ashkenazi Jewish culture in Argentina
Communism in Argentina
Communist magazines
Defunct literary magazines
Defunct magazines published in Argentina
Jewish Argentine history
Magazines established in 1925
Magazines disestablished in 1926
Magazines published in Buenos Aires
Secular Jewish culture in South America
Yiddish socialist periodicals
Yiddish culture in South America